The 1971 NCAA College Division basketball tournament involved 32 schools playing in a single-elimination tournament to determine the national champion of men's NCAA College Division college basketball as a culmination of the 1970-71 NCAA College Division men's basketball season. It was won by the University of Evansville, with Evansville's Don Buse named the Most Outstanding Player.

Southwestern Louisiana's tournament and semifinal appearances were later vacated due to NCAA rules violations.

Regional participants

*tournament appearance vacated

Regionals

Midwest - Kirksville, Missouri
Location: Pershing Arena Host: Northeast Missouri State University

Third Place - North Dakota State 96, St. Olaf 94

Mideast - Reading, Pennsylvania
Location: Bollman Center Host: Cheyney State College

Third Place - Akron 77, Wooster 68

South Atlantic - Norfolk, Virginia
Location: Norfolk Scope Host: Old Dominion University

Third Place - Stetson 91, Roanoke 72

West - Tacoma, Washington
Location: Memorial Fieldhouse Host: University of Puget Sound

Third Place - Cal Poly 70, San Francisco State 68

New England - Worcester, Massachusetts
Location: Andrew Laska Gymnasium Host: Assumption College

Third Place - Sacred Heart 86, Stonehill 81

South - Lafayette, Louisiana
Location: Blackham Coliseum Host: University of Southwestern Louisiana

Third Place - Louisiana Tech 107, LSU–New Orleans 88

Great Lakes - Evansville, Indiana
Location: Roberts Municipal Stadium Host: University of Evansville

Third Place - Ashland 88, Augustana 65

East - Buffalo, New York
Location: unknown Host: Buffalo State College

Third Place - Montclair State 80, C. W. Post 68

*denotes each overtime played

National Finals - Evansville, Indiana
Location: Roberts Municipal Stadium Host: University of Evansville
{{8TeamBracket  | RD1=National QuarterfinalsElite EightMarch 17
 | RD2=National semifinalsFinal FourMarch 18
 | RD3=National ChampionshipMarch 19
| group1=
| group2=
 | RD1-seed1=
 | RD1-team1=Kentucky Wesleyan
 | RD1-score1=89
 | RD1-seed2=
 | RD1-team2=Cheyney
 | RD1-score2=83
 | RD1-seed3=
 | RD1-team3=Old Dominion
 | RD1-score3=81*
 | RD1-seed4=
 | RD1-team4=Puget Sound
 | RD1-score4=80
 | RD1-seed5=
 | RD1-team5=Assumption
 | RD1-score5=99
 | RD1-seed6=
 | RD1-team6=
Third Place -  105, Kentucky Wesleyan 83

*denots each overtime played

All-tournament team
 Don Buse (Evansville)
 Rick Coffey (Evansville)
 John Duncan (Kentucky Wesleyan)
 Dwight Lamar (Southwestern Louisiana)
 Skip Noble (Old Dominion)

See also
 1971 NCAA University Division basketball tournament
 1971 NAIA Basketball Tournament

References

Sources
 2010 NCAA Men's Basketball Championship Tournament Records and Statistics: Division II men's basketball Championship
 1971 NCAA College Division Men's Basketball Tournament jonfmorse.com

NCAA Division II men's basketball tournament
Tournament
NCAA College Division basketball tournament
NCAA College Division basketball tournament